Kulgachia  is a village of Howrah district in the state West Bengal, India. The rail station located at the center of the town is only 40 km from howrah station and NH6 is only about 500 meter from the station area. Over the last five years it has been changed, developed and grown drastically to a town from village life though it is under panchayet raj administrative system yet. Populations are dramatically increased here nowadays due to the good communication with Kolkata, Kharagpur and other economically important parts of the state West Bengal.

Infrastructure 
Notable transportation networks include the Southeastern Railway, NH6, and Damodar. The Orissa Trunk Road is the main road and passes through the heart of the town. It connects to National Highway No-6, the Bombay Road.

Kulgachia has a railroad station.

Beside the station area there are two markets popularly known as Kulgachia super market and Ramkrisha market. Both of the markets have different types of shops, including a number of pharmacies. Chandipur Block Primary Health Centre popularly known as Chandipur hospital is only  from the station.

Geography
It is situated close to the Damodar River.

As it is an unplanned Panchayet town right now and has been known to suffer from drainage problems during periods of heavy rain. Other persistent issues are erosion caused by the Damodar river and encroachment.

Demographics

The Kulgachia area is estimated to have a population of 10,987,778.

Bus routes 
Kulgachia-Serampore
Esplanade-Bagnan Calcutta Tramways Company
Esplanade-Shyampur
Bagnan-Burdwan
Bagnan-Science City
Bagnan-Park Circus
Bagnan-Sinthee More
Bagnan-Barasat
Bagnan-Bidhannagar
Bagnan-Sealdah
Bagnan-Ruby crossing
Bagnan-Shyambazar
Howrah-Bakshi
Howrah-Digha
Howrah-Ghatal
Howrah-Chandrakona Road

Colleges 
OmDayal Group of Institutions
Vivekananda Ramakrishna Mission B.Ed. College

Schools 
Srikrishnapur Chittaranjan High School
Ideal Public School

Pirpur JUC Institute
Joargori High School
Netaji Balika vidyalaya
Kamina High School

KG Schools 
Shishu Siksha Niketan
Children's Academy
Ankur
Vivekananda KG School
Adhyayan Public School

References 

Villages in Howrah district